Sunius debilicornis is a species of rove beetle in the family Staphylinidae.

References

Further reading

 

Paederinae
Articles created by Qbugbot
Beetles described in 1857